Illa Meery (1915–2010) was a Russian-born French singer and film actress.

Selected filmography
 Princess Olala (1928)
 The Abduction of the Sabine Women (1928)
 Cagliostro (1929)
 Lake of Ladies (1934)
 Zouzou (1934)

References

Bibliography
 Chandler, Charlotte. Marlene: Marlene Dietrich, A Personal Biography. Simon and Schuster, 2011.

External links

1915 births
2010 deaths
French women singers
French film actresses
French silent film actresses
20th-century French actresses
Russian women singers
Russian film actresses
Russian silent film actresses
Emigrants from the Russian Empire to France
Actresses from Moscow
Singers from Moscow
Emigrants from the Russian Empire to the United States